Macroprolactin is a physiologically inactive form of prolactin found in a small proportion of people. It is in fact prolactin bound to IgG.

Macroprolactin, also conventionally known as “big-big prolactin”, refers to the presence of marked hyperprolactinemia associated with evidence of prolactin-IgG (typically IgG4) circulating complexes displaying a molecular weight of approximately 150 kDa (which is hence 6–7 fold higher that the native molecule) or, less frequently, polymeric aggregate of highly glycosylated prolactin monomers or prolactin-IgA complexes (i.e. non-IgG-type macroprolactin) 

In patients with hyperprolactinemia, the serum pattern of prolactin isoforms usually encompasses 60%–90% monomeric prolactin, 15%–30% big-prolactin and 0%–10% big-big prolactin 

The condition of macroprolactinaemia is hence defined as predominance (i.e. >30%–60%) of circulating prolactin isoforms with molecular weight >100 kDa

Macroprolactin is important, as some laboratory assays will detect it as prolactin, leading to a falsely elevated prolactin result. This can lead to a misdiagnosis of hyperprolactinaemia in some people, especially those with other symptoms, such as infertility or menstrual problems.

There are certain chemicals, such as polyethylene glycol, that can be added to remove macroprolactin from a suspicious sample. The sample can then be re-analysed to see if the prolactin levels are still high.The gold standard test to diagnose macroprolactin is gel-filtration chromatography.

Literature 
 Sadideen H, Swaminathan R. (2006): "Macroprolactin: what is it and what is its importance?" Int J Clin Pract. 60(4):457-61.

References

Chemical pathology
Endocrinology